Onychostoma fangi is a species of cyprinid in the genus Onychostoma.

References

fangi
Cyprinid fish of Asia
Fish described in 2000